Count Ladislav Pejačević of Virovitica (Sopron, Kingdom of Hungary 5 April 1824 – Našice, 7 April 1901) was a Croatian aristocrat and statesman, a member of the Pejačević noble family, remarkable and influential in the Kingdom of Croatia-Slavonia within the Austro-Hungarian Empire. He was the Ban (viceroy) of Croatia between 1880 and 1883.

Biography

Ladislav Pejačević was the eldest son of Ferdinand Karlo Rajner /Ferdinand Charles Rainer/ (1800–1878) whose mother was Hungarian Countess Mária Eleonóra née Erdődy /monyorókeréki and monoszlói branch/ (1769—1840). His wife was Marija /Mary/ née Döry de Jobaháza. His grandfather Karlo III Ferdinand was the founder of Našice branch of the family.

On November 25, 1852, he married the baroness Gabrijela /Gabrielle/ Döry de Jobaháza and they had three children: Marija, Teodor /Theodore/ and Mario Marko Aleksandar.

Pejačević entered politics as a young man, having become an assessor at the Croatian Parliament seat in Zagreb from 1844 until 1848. As a very influential Croatian politician, he was member of Parliament from the Unionist Party of Croatia and member of the delegation of Parliament that signed the Croatian-Hungarian Agreement in 1868. In 1880 Sabor - the Parliament of Croatia - elected him as Ban of Croatia, and he stayed in office from February 21, 1880, until September 4, 1883.

As the reincorporation of the Croatian and Slavonian Frontiers into Croatian-Slavonian Crown land was proclaimed on July 15, 1881, Pejačević was given the task to perform it. On August 1, 1881, he took over the administration of the former Frontiers.

On August 24, 1883, he quit after the Council of ministers in Vienna concluded that bilingual Croatian-Hungarian official emblems in Croatia, installed by the Hungarian administration, should stay and were not allowed to be removed from the official buildings. On 4 September 1883 Hermann Ramberg became the royal commissioner with Ban authorities. Ramberg was then succeeded by Károly Khuen-Héderváry, a Hungarian political hardliner, whose reign was marked by strong Hungarization.

During his life, Ladislav Pejačević invested a lot to improve and enlarge business activities of his estates, and contributed to beauty and glamour of his castles, palaces and parks, especially the Našice castle. He died in Našice on April 7, 1901, and left his property to his son Teodor.

See also

House of Pejačević
Ban of Croatia
Croatian nobility
Teodor Pejačević

References

 Rudolf Horvat, "Najnovije doba hrvatske povijesti", Zagreb, 1906.
 Neda Engelsfeld: "Povijest hrvatske države i prava: razdoblje od 18. do 20. stoljeća", Pravni fakultet, Zagreb, 2002. 
 Magyar Életrajzi Lexikon

External links
Ladislav Pejačević – member of the noble family that owned a large number of castles
Ladislav Pejačević – the owner of Našice estate
Genealogy and heraldry of the Pejačević noble family
Ladislaus Pejachevich – Banus von Kroatien
Kip domovine leta 188*, a short story by Antun Gustav Matoš depicting an episode from the revolt that led to the end of Pejačević's banhood.

Ladislav
1824 births
1901 deaths
Bans of Croatia
Counts of Croatia
Croatian Austro-Hungarians
People from Slavonia
19th-century Croatian people
19th-century Croatian nobility
20th-century Croatian nobility